Bunce may refer to:

People
Bunce (surname)
Bunce baronets

Places
Bunce Island, Sierra Leone
Bunce Court School, a German-Jewish school in Kent, England, United Kingdom, (renamed after its move from Nazi Germany)
Bunceton, Missouri, a city, United States

Other
The Bunce, 1980 novel by Michael de Larrabeiti

See also
Titus-Bunce House
Bunce–Deddens algebra